Sleith is an extinct town in Braxton County, in the U.S. state of West Virginia.

History
A post office called Sleith was established in 1886, and remained in operation until 1948. The community took its name from nearby Sleith Fork.

References

Ghost towns in West Virginia
Landforms of Braxton County, West Virginia